Chinese Box is a 1997 movie directed by Wayne Wang and starring Jeremy Irons, Gong Li, Maggie Cheung and Michael Hui.

The movie is set and was made at the time of Hong Kong's handover to the People's Republic of China on June 30, 1997. The film credits Paul Theroux as a source for the story, based on themes he explores in his 1997 novel Kowloon Tong.

Plot 
The movie unfolds at least nine different stories on very different levels.

First, there is John as a reporter, trying to capture interesting scenes on the streets of Hong Kong, persuading himself his work gives his life a tangible meaning.

Second, there is Vivian who is looking to find a balance in life, trying to escape from the underground she once was a part of and forget about her past, but is hindered in her attempts by prejudices that go back thousands of years in the Chinese society (including Hong Kong).

Third, there is Vivian (still), with a chance to discard most of her problems by simply marrying John and moving to England with him. Even though she is tempted to do so, she knows this would just be running away from the core of the problem and could not be a long-term solution, mostly because of their different cultural backgrounds and maybe even because of a subtle uncertainty regarding John's ex-wife and former life.

Fourth, there is Jean, with her own story and with a typical Hong Kong here-today-who-knows-where-tomorrow attitude - living the moment, enjoying and suffering at the same time, embodying a perfect reflection of modern life, especially so easily seen in Hong Kong in the late 1990s. She understands all of the different kinds of hardships that come in life and, with her face somewhat disfigured, is marked more intensely than most, but also knows where to draw the line in selling herself. John tries to help her, but does that in a dishonest way, which disappoints her tremendously. According to a note in film's credits, Jean's story was inspired by a short story by the American-British author Rachel Ingalls.

Fifth, there are John and Jim. Close, mutually understanding, with enough humor and sarcasm to keep them going through both the good and the bad days. Even though their outlooks towards life differ significantly, their love for the job (journalism) creates a strong bond of true friendship.

Sixth, there is Chang, a man of power, of high position, but a wimp in his heart. His immense wealth cannot replace what he lacks in personality. He has no charisma, no morality, no care, and exists purely on his imaginary throne of pretentiousness and status. While he is ashamed of Vivian, he does love her, but in a pathetic, cowardly way. He is very much into 'saving face' and can not find an equilibrium in his life (professional nor personal). He agrees to marry Vivian, but deceives her by arranging merely a mock wedding photo session, so she could have some pictures to send to her family. Vivian burns all of the photos and accepts the notion she will never be happy nor free.

Seventh, there are John and Vivian. A story of true love that just isn't meant to be. Not because they wouldn't want it to, but because of the constraints of the societies they live in.

Eighth, there is John (again), perplexed with his own mortality, which he is suddenly forced to face.

Ninth, there is the political aspect of Hong Kong politically becoming a part of China again, which (at the time) was a great uncertainty.

Filming locations
The movie shows the actual temporary press room which was specially set up for the press coverage of the handover, and located in the old part of the Convention and Exhibition Centre.

Certain scenes were shot at the Main Bar of the Foreign Correspondents' Club.

The main characters residence in the film was shot in a flat located along Central–Mid-Levels escalators, just below Hollywood Road in Central.

Cast and roles include
 Jeremy Irons - John Spencer
 Gong Li - Vivian 
 Maggie Cheung - Jean 
 Michael Hui - Chang 
 Rubén Blades - Jim
 Jared Harris - William 
 Chaplin Chang - Homeless Man 
 Noel Rands - John's Friend at New Year's Party 
 Emma Lucia - Amanda Everheart 
 Ken Bennett - Rick 
 Russell Cawthorne - New Year's Party MC 
 Emotion Cheung - William Wong 
 Harvey Stockwin - Weeks 
 Jonathan Midgley - Jonathan 
 Bruce Walker - Bruce
 Angelica Lofgren - Baby-Lin
 Dr. Julian Chang - Dr. Chang
 Jian Rui Chao - Businessman #1
 Wai Sing Chau - Businessman #2
 Hung Lo - Businessman #3
 Shirley Hung - Girlfriend #1
 Michelle Yeung - Girlfriend #2
 Alex Ng - Drunk karaoke singer
 Chiu Wah Lee - Minibus passenger
 Maria Cordero - Mamasan
 Pao Fong - Godfather
 Hui Fan - Godfather's wife
 Lam Man Cheung - Wedding photographer
 Lee Siu-kei - Gangster #1
 Leung Chi On - Gangster #2
 Tse Yuen Fat - Gangster #3
 Roderick Lee - Manhattan Club bouncer
 Hui Li - Black Moon hostess
 Maria St. Lynne - Black Moon hostess
 Josie Ho - Lilly

See also
 List of films set in Hong Kong
 M. Butterfly

References

External links
 
 
 
 "Hong Kong as City/Imaginary in The World of Suzie Wong, Love is a Many Splendored Thing, and Chinese Box", by Thomas Y. T. Luk, The Chinese University of Hong Kong

1997 films
Films set in Hong Kong
1997 romantic drama films
American romantic drama films
Films about Chinese Americans
Films about interracial romance
Films directed by Wayne Wang
Films with screenplays by Jean-Claude Carrière
Films scored by Graeme Revell
Paul Theroux
Chinese-language American films
1990s American films